Rupert was Vogt at Siegen and is one of the eldest known possible ancestors of the House of Nassau.

Life
Rupert is mentioned at Siegen between 1079 and 1082 as the owner of parts of the lands of Lipporn/Laurenburg, and in a charter from 1079/89 as Vogt at Siegen. He was a vassal of the Electorate of Mainz. It is possible that Rupert was already Count of Laurenburg, but he isn't mentioned as such in any charter.

Perhaps Rupert was a son of Adelhart, who is mentioned in a charter from 1048 as Vogt at Haiger for the Abbey of Worms. Rupert was the father of Dudo of Laurenburg.

There are more persons known who, as owners of the lands of Lipporn/Laurenburg (and thus the predecessors of Rupert), probably also were his ancestors. The first is a certain Drutwin mentioned in 881 as a landowner in Prüm, and who is the oldest known possible ancestor of the House of Nassau.

References

Sources
 This article was translated from the corresponding Dutch Wikipedia on September 12th, 2019. 
 
 

House of Nassau
11th-century people of the Holy Roman Empire
Year of birth unknown
Year of death unknown